rdesktop is an implementation of a client software for Microsoft's proprietary Remote Desktop Protocol (RDP). Rdesktop is free and open-source software, subject to the requirements of the GNU General Public License (GPL-3.0-or-later), and is available for Linux and BSD as well as for Microsoft Windows.

As of August 2013, rdesktop implements a large subset of the RDP 5 protocol. Unlike Remote Desktop Connection in modern versions of Windows, rdesktop still  supports the older RDP 4.0 protocol used by Windows NT 4.0 Terminal Server Edition and Windows 2000 Server.

Feature set 

RDP5 features supported:
 Bitmap caching
 File system, audio, serial port and printer port redirection
 Mappings for most international keyboards
 Stream compression and encryption
 Automatic authentication
 Smartcard support
 RemoteApp like support called "seamless" mode via SeamlessRDP
 Network Level Authentication

Still unimplemented are:
 Client redirection upon reconnect (of disconnected session)
 Remote Assistance requests
 USB device redirection

Support for the additional features available in RDP 5.1 and RDP 6 (including multi-head display spanning, window composition and console connection) have not yet been implemented, although some have been officially documented on MSDN.

Use
Rdesktop is commonly used on desktop ReactOS and Linux installations to connect to Microsoft Windows running Remote Desktop Services. There are many GUI clients, like tsclient, Gnome-RDP and KDE Remote Desktop Connection (KRDC), which are graphical front-ends to rdesktop. The program has also been integrated into several thin client Linux distributions like Thinstation and the PC TSC project, as well as some thin client appliances.

See also

 FreeRDP – a fork of rdesktop that is further developed under the Apache License
 xrdp – an implementation of a server software for RDP
 Comparison of remote desktop software

References

External links
rdesktop website
KRDC - KDE Remote Desktop Connection
Gnome-RDP - GNOME front-end for rdesktop
xrdp - RDP server for Unix, based on rdesktop
CoRD - A native Cocoa interface for the OS X port of rdesktop.
properJavaRDP - rdesktop-based Free Java Remote Desktop Connection Client
Rdesktop-Win32 - Win32 build of rdesktop

Free network-related software
Free software programmed in C
Thin clients
Remote desktop software for Linux